Perno is a district in the Naantalintie ward of the city of Turku, in Finland. It is located to the west of the city, and is mainly a high-density residential suburb. There is also a large maritime dock (Meyer Turku) located there.

The current population of Perno is 2,513, and it is increasing at an annual rate of 0.28%. 17.83% of the district's population are under 15 years old, while 9.39% are over 65. The district's linguistic makeup is 90.81% Finnish, 2.39% Swedish, and 6.80% other.

See also
 Districts of Turku
 Districts of Turku by population

Districts of Turku